The 12389 / 12390 Gaya–Chennai Central Weekly Superfast Express is a Superfast Express train of the Indian Railways connecting  in Bihar and  of Tamil Nadu. It is currently being operated with 12389/12390 train numbers on a weekly basis. Henceforth it arrives and departs from Chennai Central instead of Chennai Egmore

Service

The 12389/Gaya–Chennai Central Weekly Superfast Express has an average speed of 60 km/hr and covers 2348 km in 39 hrs. 12390/Chennai Central–Gaya Weekly Superfast Express has an average speed of 62 km/hr and covers 2348 km in 38 hrs 40 mins.

Route & halts

The important halts of the train are:

Coach composition

The train has standard LHB rake with max speed of 130 kmph. The train consists of 22 coaches:

 2 AC II Tier
 3 AC III Tier
 10 Sleeper coaches
 1 Pantry car
 4 General
 2 Generator coach

Traction

Both trains are hauled by a Gomoh Loco Shed-based WAP-7 locomotive from Gaya Junction to Chennai Central and vice versa.

Rake sharing

The train shares its rake with 12397/12398 Mahabodhi Express.

See also 

 Gaya Junction railway station
 Chennai Central railway station
 Mahabodhi Express

Notes

External links 

 Gaya–Chennai Egmore Weekly SF Express India Rail Info
 12390/Chennai Egmore–Gaya Weekly SF Express India Rail Info

References 

Transport in Gaya, India
Transport in Chennai
Rail transport in Bihar
Rail transport in Uttar Pradesh
Rail transport in Madhya Pradesh
Rail transport in Telangana
Rail transport in Andhra Pradesh
Rail transport in Tamil Nadu
Express trains in India